John Joseph Davis was an Irish rugby international. He won two caps in the 1898 Home Nations Championship playing as a forward; in the nineteenth century, there was very little or no positional specialisation in forward play in rugby.

References

Irish rugby union players
Ireland international rugby union players
Monkstown Football Club players
1874 births
1903 deaths
Rugby union players from County Carlow
Rugby union forwards